ERCA may refer to:

Extended Range Cannon Artillery
Essex Region Conservation Authority
Catalan Red Liberation Army